The seventh season of MasterChef Canada, titled  MasterChef Canada: Back to Win, premiered on February 14, 2021 on CTV and concluded on May 16, 2021. Filmed in June 2020, this is an all-star season, featuring returning contestants from previous seasons. 

Chinese-Canadian dessert bar and bakery owner Christopher Siu from Season 2 was crowned the winner, with Andrew "Andy" Hay and Dorothea "Thea" VanHerwaarden finishing as co-runner-ups. Siu became the first previously eliminated contestant to win the competition. Hay and VanHerwaarden were previously runner-ups in Season 5 and Season 4, respectively. This marks the first time that three contestants competed in the finale, and a contestant who was eliminated has ever won the competition.

Top 12
Except where noted, source for all names, hometowns, and occupations:

Elimination table

After April Lee was forced to withdraw due to an injury in episode 3, Barrie was brought back to the competition.This contestant was on the winning team but was selected to compete in the pressure test by their team captain.
 (WINNER) This cook won the competition.
 (RUNNER-UP) This cook finished in second place.
 (WIN) The cook won the individual challenge (Mystery Box Challenge or Elimination Test).
 (WIN) The cook was on the winning team in the Team Challenge and was directly advanced to the next round.
 (HIGH) The cook was one of the top entries in the Mystery Box Challenge, but did not win, or received considerable praise during an Elimination Test.
 (PT) The cook was on the losing team in the Team Challenge or did not win the individual challenge, but won the Pressure Test.
 (IN) The cook was not selected as a top entry or bottom entry in an individual challenge.
 (IN) The cook was not selected as a top entry or bottom entry in a team challenge.
 (IMM) The cook did not have to compete in that round of the competition and was safe from elimination.
 (IMM) The cook was selected by Mystery Box Challenge winner and did not have to compete in the Elimination Test. 
 (PT) The cook was on the losing team in the Team Challenge, competed in the Pressure Test, and advanced.
 (NPT) The cook was on the losing team in the Team Challenge, but was exempted from the Pressure Test
 (RET) The cook was eliminated but came back to compete to return to the competition.
 (LOW) The cook was one of the bottom entries in an individual elimination challenge or a pressure test and advanced.
 (LOW) The cook was one of the bottom entries in the Team Challenge, and advanced.
 (WDR) The cook was evacuated from the competition.
 (ELIM) The cook was eliminated from MasterChef.

Episodes

References

MasterChef Canada
2021 Canadian television seasons